Mir Zafar Ali is a Pakistani movie visual effects artist. He was a member of the team that won the Academy Award for best visual effects for the 2007 film The Golden Compass. In 2012, he was a member of the team that won the Academy Award for best visual effects for The Life of Pi and in 2014 he was a member of the team that won the Academy Award for the film Frozen. He is the first Pakistani to have been connected with an Academy Award-winner for Best Visual Effects.

Education 
Ali is a graduate of the Beaconhouse School System. He completed his computer science degree from National University in Pakistan.
He graduated from Savannah College of Art and Design (SCAD) and, in 2019, was awarded the SCAD40 award.

Career
Ali has worked on visual effects and graphics in many Hollywood movies, including The Day After Tomorrow, X-Men: First Class, Stealth, Monster House, The Golden Compass, The Incredible Hulk, Surf's Up, The Mummy: Tomb of the Dragon Emperor and Aliens in the Attic among others. 

Ali has worked for several visual effects shops in Hollywood including Digital Domain and Rhythm and Hues.

Filmography

References

Further reading

External links
 

Visual effects artists
Special effects people
Beaconhouse School System alumni
Pakistani animators
Pakistani computer scientists
Savannah College of Art and Design alumni
Living people
Artists from Karachi
National University of Computer and Emerging Sciences alumni
Pakistani expatriates in the United States
Year of birth missing (living people)